This list of churches in Slagelse Municipality lists church buildings in Slagelse Municipality, Denmark.

List

See also
 List of churches in Næstved Municipality

References

External links

 Nordens kirker: Nordvestsjælland

Churches
Slagelse